Mau may refer to:

Places

Kenya 
 Mau Escarpment
 Mau Forest

India 
 Mau, Bhind, a town in Madhya Pradesh
 Mau, Mawal, Pune district, Marahrashtra
 Mau, Punjab, a village in Punjab
 Mau, Uttar Pradesh, India
 Mau district, Uttar Pradesh

Vietnam 
 Cà Mau, a city in Vietnam

People

Surname
 August Mau, German art historian and archaeologist
 Bruce Mau, Canadian designer
 , German photographer and companion of novelist Hubert Fichte
 Vũ Văn Mẫu, the last Prime Minister of South Vietnam

Other names
 Maú (footballer), Santomean footballer
 Mau Piailug, a traditional Micronesian navigator
 Mau Power, an Australian hip hop artist, born Patrick Mau

Animals
 Arabian Mau, a short-haired cat breed
 Egyptian Mau, a short-haired cat breed

Other uses 
 Har-mau, an alternative name for the ancient Egyptian deity Horus
 Mau Heymans, a Dutch comics artist for Disney
 Mau movement, the non-violent anti-colonial movement of Samoa
 Mau-Nilsonne Syndrome, a deformity of the knees better known as Blount's disease
 Mau rakau, the pre-colonial martial system of the Maori people of New Zealand
 Mao (card game)

See also 
 Mao (disambiguation)
 Mao Zedong, leader of China 1943–1976
 MAU (disambiguation)
 Mau Mau (disambiguation)
 Maus (disambiguation)
 Maw (disambiguation)